Corbridge Vicar's Pele is a pele tower in the village of Corbridge, Northumberland, England.

It was a three-storey defensive pele tower, with one room to each storey, built in the churchyard in 1318, and used as the vicarage for the adjacent church. It is built largely from sandstone taken from the Roman fortress at Coria nearby.  It was in use as a vicarage until the early 17th century.  In the summer of 2016 the tower was re-opened as a wedding and events venue after a three-year redevelopment project.

References

Further reading
Fry, Plantagenet Somerset, The David & Charles Book of Castles, David & Charles, 1980.

External links
Corbridge Pele Website

Buildings and structures completed in 1318
Houses completed in the 14th century
Towers completed in the 14th century
Peel towers in Northumberland
Ruins in Northumberland
Vicar's Pele